Sapat Group, also known as Sapat, is a diversified corporate conglomerate headquartered in Mumbai, India.

It was established in the year 1897 by Mr. Ramashankar Haribhai Joshi. It is currently under the leadership of MD Dr. Nikhil Joshi. Its products include Tea, OTC drugs and personal care products.

The company started with Sapat Lotion, its first OTC product followed by a foray into the tea industry, resulting in the introduction of Sapat Chai, Sapat is ranked among the top 10 packaged tea companies in India. Today Sapat operates under 4 different divisions that are tea, retail, consumer health, and real estate.

.

History

1897
Sapat was founded in 1897 by RH Joshi. The company started with the product Sapat Lotion.

1910s
Following the growth of Sapat Pharmaceuticals, the company decided to venture in the tea industry. This venture gave way to the introduction of the Sapat Chai brand as loose tea outlets. Sapat expands its business overseas, becomes a leading exporter of Chai to the Middle East.

1940s
Sapat Pharmaceuticals broadens its horizons both geographically and with new products.

1960s-80s
The Company introduces Sapat Chai in packets.

1990s
Sapat introduces Parivar Chai. The company made headlines in the marketing community through the use of the youth called CAs (communication agents), who played the role of brand ambassadors in their villages. This made Sapat one of the fastest growing tea brands in India.

1990s
The Company decided to foray into real-estate and organized retail. Sapat fresh loose tea stores were opened up, by expanding the business through franchising.

2000
Sapat sets up to expand its tea brands with a new look to Parivar Chai and a significant expansion of distribution.

2003
Sapat introduces a new product in the range of premium dust tea, Sahyadri.

2007
Sapat launches ChaiTime, a range of Indian flavored teas in association with Chef Sanjeev Kapoor.

References

Pharmaceutical companies established in 1897
Companies based in Mumbai
Food and drink companies of India
Food and drink companies established in 1897
1897 establishments in India
Conglomerate companies established in 1897